Armored Fist 2 is a video game developed and published by NovaLogic for MS-DOS in 1997.

Gameplay
Armored Fist 2 is a tank simulation and strategy game with over 50 missions in Europe, Asia, Africa, and the Middle East.

Development
To promote the game NovaLogic let 12 journalists compare simulated tanks with the real thing.

Reception
Armored Fist 2 was the best-selling simulation of tank warfare released in 1997. In the United States, it sold 26,961 copies and earned $1.21 million that year.

Reviews
 Next Generation Magazine #24 (December 1996) - preview
 Game.EXE #11 (Nov 1997)
 Computer Gaming World #163 (Feb 1998)
Gamezilla (1998)
Imperium Gier (Oct 10, 1999)
GameSpot (Nov 20, 1997)
Game Revolution (Jun 05, 2004)
All Game Guide (1998)

See also
Armored Fist
Armored Fist 3

References

External links
 Armored Fist 2 at MobyGames

1997 video games
DOS games
DOS-only games
Multiplayer and single-player video games
NovaLogic games
Tank simulation video games
Video game sequels
Video games developed in the United States
Video games with voxel graphics